These are the team rosters of the nations participating in the men's ice hockey tournament of the 2022 Winter Olympics.

Team Denmark is the oldest team in the tournament, averaging 30 years and 11 months. Team USA is the youngest, with 25 years and 5 months.

Age and clubs listed as of the start of the tournament, 9 February 2022.

Group A

Canada

The Canadian team of 25 athletes was named by Hockey Canada on January 25, 2022. The team consisted of 14 forwards (F), eight on defense (D) and three goaltenders (G).

Head coach: Claude Julien

Sidney Crosby, Connor McDavid, and Alex Pietrangelo were named to the Canadian roster on October 3, 2021 but did not participate due to the NHL's decision not to send players to the Olympics due to the COVID-19 pandemic.

China

The roster was announced on 28 January 2022.

Due to the lack of ice hockey talent in China players had to be recruited from abroad. The men's hockey team has eleven Canadians, six Chinese, seven Americans, and a Russian. Neither the Chinese Olympic Committee, International Ice Hockey Federation nor the IOC commented on how it was possible for foreign players to compete for China, as the Olympic Charter requires competitors to be citizens of the country they represent. The IOC Executive Board has the authority to make certain exceptions of a "general or individual nature", though it is unclear whether this was the case. When asked whether he had naturalized as a Chinese citizen, athlete Jake Chelios refused to comment, though he confirmed that he still had his American passport.

Head coach:  Ivano Zanatta

Germany

The roster was announced on 25 January 2022.

Head coach:  Toni Söderholm

Leon Draisaitl, Moritz Seider, and Philipp Grubauer were named to the German roster on October 8, 2021 but did not participate due to the NHL's decision not to send players to the Olympics due to the COVID-19 pandemic.

United States

The roster was announced on January 13, 2022.

Head coach: David Quinn

Auston Matthews, Patrick Kane, and Seth Jones were named to the American roster on October 7, 2021 but did not participate due to the NHL's decision not to send players to the Olympics due to the COVID-19 pandemic.

Group B

Czech Republic

The roster was announced on 13 January 2022.

Head coach: Filip Pešán

Jakub Voráček, David Pastrňák, and Ondřej Palát were named to the Czech roster on October 7, 2021 but did not participate due to the NHL's decision not to send players to the Olympics due to the COVID-19 pandemic.

Denmark 

The roster was announced on 18 January 2022.

Head coach: Heinz Ehlers

Nikolaj Ehlers, Oliver Bjorkstrand, and Alexander True were named to the Danish roster on October 8, 2021 but did not participate due to the NHL's decision not to send players to the Olympics due to the COVID-19 pandemic.

ROC 

The roster was announced on 23 January 2022.

Head coach: Alexei Zhamnov

Alexander Ovechkin, Nikita Kucherov, and Andrei Vasilevskiy were named to the ROC roster on October 8, 2021 but did not participate due to the NHL's decision not to send players to the Olympics due to the COVID-19 pandemic.

Switzerland

The roster was announced on 18 January 2022.

Head coach: Patrick Fischer

Roman Josi, Timo Meier, and Nico Hischier were named to the Swiss roster on October 8, 2021 but did not participate due to the NHL's decision not to send players to the Olympics due to the COVID-19 pandemic.

Group C

Finland

The roster was announced on 20 January 2022.

Head coach: Jukka Jalonen

Sebastian Aho, Aleksander Barkov, and Mikko Rantanen were named to the Finnish roster on October 7, 2021 but did not participate due to the NHL's decision not to send players to the Olympics due to the COVID-19 pandemic.

Latvia

The roster was announced on 24 January 2022.

Head coach: Harijs Vītoliņš

Rūdolfs Balcers, Zemgus Girgensons, and Kristiāns Rubīns were named to the Latvian roster on October 8, 2021 but did not participate due to the NHL's decision not to send players to the Olympics due to the COVID-19 pandemic.

Slovakia

The roster was announced on 18 January 2022.

Head coach:  Craig Ramsay

Andrej Sekera, Erik Černák, and Jaroslav Halák were named to the Slovak roster on October 8, 2021 but did not participate due to the NHL's decision not to send players to the Olympics due to the COVID-19 pandemic.

Sweden

The roster was announced on 21 January 2022.

Head coach: Johan Garpenlöv

Victor Hedman, Mika Zibanejad, and Gabriel Landeskog were named to the Swedish team on October 5, 2021 but did not participate due to the NHL's decision not to send players to the Olympics due to the COVID-19 pandemic.

References

rosters
Lists of competitors at the 2022 Winter Olympics
2022